Scoville Memorial Library is a historic building on the campus of Carleton College in Northfield, Minnesota, United States.  It is listed on the National Register of Historic Places. It was the college's library until the current library was built in the 1950s. Until 2016 it housed several student support organizations and the Cinema and Media Studies department. Currently the building is under intensive renovations and will soon house the Admissions and Financial Aid offices.

It was built in 1896 and listed on the National Register of Historic Places (NRHP) in 1982.

The construction of this library "completed the historic core of buildings" on the Carleton College campus.  Also NRHP-listed on the campus are Willis Hall, built 1868–72, and Goodsell Observatory, built 1887.

References

External links
 Historic Campus Architecture Project: Scoville Hall

Carleton College
Buildings and structures in Rice County, Minnesota
Library buildings completed in 1896
Libraries on the National Register of Historic Places in Minnesota
Romanesque Revival architecture in Minnesota
University and college buildings on the National Register of Historic Places in Minnesota
National Register of Historic Places in Rice County, Minnesota